Mouhammad "Mo" Faye (born September 14, 1985) is a Senegalese professional basketball player who plays for Al Rayyan. He also represents the senior Senegalese national team.

Early life and high school career
Faye was born to Demba and Mame Youmane Niang Faye. He is the youngest of five children; his oldest brother, Assane Faye, played basketball at the University of New Hampshire. Faye attended SEED Academy in Dakar, Senegal. In 2002, he was a member of the Senegalese under-18 national basketball team, and in 2004 he was a member of the under-20 national team.

College career

Due to a delay in the translation of his transcripts, Faye sat out his first season and was cleared to begin practice with the team in the fall 2006 semester. He started his career as a redshirt freshman in the 2006–07 season, but his initial playing status was in question due to a wrist injury that he sustained in a pickup game over the summer. Faye became a starter when his teammate Lewis Clinch was suspended for the remainder of the 2006–07 season on January 5, 2007. Faye was sidelined again on February 5, 2007 after struggling with flu-like symptoms, which coach Paul Hewitt speculated may have been caused by mononucleosis.

Professional career
Faye played for the Dallas Mavericks in the NBA Summer League in 2010. He later signed with the NBA D-League club Rio Grande Valley Vipers.

After one year in the NBA D-League, he signed with Hyeres-Toulon of the LNB Pro B averaging 12 points and 5 rebounds per game.

For the 2012–13 season, he joined Ikaros Kallitheas of the Greek Basket League, The next year, he joined Panelefsiniakos and for the 2014–15 season he played for Rethymno.

On August 13, 2015, Faye joined Pallacanestro Varese. He left the team before the end of the season, as he was found positive for doping. He was also suspended for six months from basketball. On July 17, 2016, Faye signed with the Greek team Promitheas Patras. On April 24, 2017, Faye signed with the Lebanese team Sagesse.

On August 4, 2018, he moved to Serbia and signed with Crvena zvezda for the 2018–19 season. On June 28, 2019, he re-signed with Crvena zvezda for one more season. On February 7, 2020, Faye and the Serbian club officially parted ways.

On July 17, 2020, Faye officially returned to Greece, once again for Promitheas.

On February 25, 2021, he has signed with Boulazac Basket Dordogne of the LNB Pro A.

On March 1, 2023, Faye was announced by Al-Rayyan Doha of the Qatari Basketball League (QBL).

National team career
Faye has been a long-time member of the senior Senegalese national basketball team. With Senegal, he has played at the following FIBA AfroBasket tournaments: the 2007 FIBA Africa Championship, the 2009 FIBA Africa Championship, the 2011 FIBA Africa Championship, the 2013 FIBA Africa Championship, the 2015 AfroBasket, and the 2017 AfroBasket. He won bronze medals at the 2013 FIBA Africa Championship, and the 2017 AfroBasket. 

He also played with Senegal at the 2014 FIBA World Cup, and at the 2019 FIBA World Cup.

References

External links

 EuroLeague.net profile
 FIBA Archive profile
 Eurobasket.com profile
 Italian League profile 

1985 births
Living people
2014 FIBA Basketball World Cup players
2019 FIBA Basketball World Cup players
ABA League players
Basketball League of Serbia players
Basketball players from Dakar
Boulazac Basket Dordogne players
Mouhammad
Greek Basket League players
Georgia Tech Yellow Jackets men's basketball players
HTV Basket players
Ikaros B.C. players
KK Crvena zvezda players
Lega Basket Serie A players
Pallacanestro Varese players
Panelefsiniakos B.C. players
Promitheas Patras B.C. players
Power forwards (basketball)
Rethymno B.C. players
Rio Grande Valley Vipers players
Senegalese men's basketball players
Senegalese expatriate basketball people in France
Senegalese expatriate basketball people in Greece
Senegalese expatriate basketball people in Italy
Senegalese expatriate basketball people in Lebanon
Senegalese expatriate basketball people in Russia
Senegalese expatriate basketball people in Serbia
Senegalese expatriate basketball people in the United States
SMU Mustangs men's basketball players
Sagesse SC basketball players
Al-Rayyan SC basketball players